The olive manakin (Xenopipo uniformis) is a species of bird in the family Pipridae.

It is found in Brazil, Guyana, and Venezuela. Its natural habitat is subtropical or tropical moist montane forest.

References

olive manakin
Birds of the Guianas
Birds of Venezuela
olive manakin
olive manakin
olive manakin
Taxonomy articles created by Polbot